Le Thaumaturge chinois, sold in the United States as Tchin-Chao, the Chinese Conjurer and in Britain as The Chinese Juggler, is a 1904 French short silent film by Georges Méliès. It was sold by Méliès's Star Film Company and is numbered 578–580 in its catalogues.

Méliès plays the conjurer of the title; his tricks are worked using substitution splices and dissolves. The motion in the film is noticeably fast, even at silent-film speeds such as 16 frames per second; Méliès may have had his camera operator deliberately undercrank the camera to create a stylized effect.

References

External links

French black-and-white films
Films directed by Georges Méliès
French silent short films
1904 films
1900s French films